Leonard Mekaj (born 27 February 1995) is a Kosovan professional basketball player who currently plays for Golden Eagle Ylli of the Kosovo Basketball Superleague. The club currently plays in the Kosovo Basketball Superleague, Balkan International Basketball League (BIBL) and FIBA Europe Cup.

Leonard Mekaj has played with Kosovo in FIBA Europe Under-20 Championship and was one of the best players of the team with very good performances including stats 13.4 points, 5.9 assists(3rd ranking), 3.3 rebounds.
Leonard Mekaj now is a member of the Kosovo national basketball team.

References

1995 births
Living people
Kosovan men's basketball players
Point guards
KB Ylli players